The following low-power television stations broadcast on digital or analog channel 24 in the United States:

 K24AG-D in Trapper Creek, Alaska
 K24BY-D in Pahrump, Nevada
 K24CH-D in Cortez, etc., Colorado
 K24CT-D in Alamogordo, New Mexico
 K24CY-D in St. George, Utah
 K24DD-D in Plevna, Montana
 K24DK-D in Bullhead City, Arizona
 K24DT-D in Aberdeen, South Dakota
 K24EY-D in Walker Lake, Nevada
 K24EZ-D in Idalia, Colorado
 K24FE-D in Beaver, etc., Utah
 K24FF-D in Lovelock, Nevada
 K24FH-D in Glide, etc., Oregon
 K24FL-D in Columbus, Montana
 K24FU-D in Pleasant Valley, Colorado
 K24GD-D in Hardin, Montana
 K24GE-D in Wells, Nevada
 K24GO-D in Blair, Nebraska
 K24GT-D in Kemmerer, Wyoming
 K24GY-D in Ely, Nevada
 K24HG-D in Cozad, Nebraska
 K24HH-D in Wichita Falls, Texas
 K24HP-D in Price, etc., Utah
 K24HQ-D in Boulder, Colorado
 K24HU-D in Burley, etc., Idaho
 K24IB-D in Verdi/Mogul, Nevada
 K24ID-D in Ferndale, Montana
 K24IM-D in Keosauqua, Iowa
 K24IN-D in Green River, Utah
 K24IP-D in Huntington, Utah
 K24IT-D in Hoquiam, Washington
 K24IV-D in Farmington, New Mexico
 K24IX-D in Turkey, Texas
 K24IY-D in Raton, New Mexico
 K24JE-D in Sunriver, Oregon
 K24JG-D in Norfolk, Nebraska
 K24JL-D in Beowowe, Nevada
 K24JN-D in Lewiston, Idaho
 K24JO-D in Crawford, Colorado
 K24JV-D in St. James, Minnesota
 K24KG-D in Madras, Oregon
 K24KJ-D in Libby, Montana
 K24KM-D in Colstrip, etc., Montana
 K24KR-D in Jacks Cabin, Colorado
 K24KS-D in Flagstaff, Arizona
 K24KT-D in Walker, Minnesota
 K24KU-D in Chinook, Montana
 K24KV-D in Logan, Utah
 K24KX-D in Cedarville, California
 K24LM-D in Bridgeport, Washington
 K24LQ-D in Collbran, Colorado
 K24LS-D in Lucerne Valley, California
 K24MB-D in Hobbs, New Mexico
 K24MC-D in Baker Valley, Oregon
 K24MD-D in Sayre, Oklahoma
 K24MF-D in Florence, Oregon
 K24MH-D in Powers, Oregon
 K24MI-D in Redding, California
 K24MJ-D in Shoshoni, Wyoming
 K24MK-D in Glenrock, Wyoming
 K24ML-D in Taos, New Mexico
 K24MO-D in Tyler, Texas
 K24MP-D in Butte, Montana
 K24MQ-D in Marysvale, Utah
 K24MS-D in Roseau, Minnesota
 K24MU-D in Summit County, Utah
 K24MV-D in Fort Peck, Montana
 K24MW-D in Clovis, New Mexico
 K24MX-D in Deming, New Mexico
 K24MY-D in Kanarraville, Utah
 K24MZ-D in Fillmore, etc., Utah
 K24NA-D in Delta, Utah
 K24NB-D in Elko, Nevada
 K24NC-D in Roosevelt, Utah
 K24ND-D in Orangeville, Utah
 K24NE-D in Overton, Nevada
 K24NF-D in Tucumcari, New Mexico
 K24NG-D in Lake Havasu City, Arizona
 K24NH-D in Durango, Colorado
 K24NI-D in Yuma, Arizona
 K24NK-D in Memphis, Texas
 K24NM-D in Sargents, Colorado
 K24NO-D in Bonners Ferry, Idaho
 K24NQ-D in Golconda, Nevada
 K24NR-D in Amarillo, Texas
 K24NS-D in Stateline, Nevada
 K24NZ-D in Carbondale, Colorado
 K24OJ-D in Uvalde, Texas
 K44JP-D in Cottage Grove, Oregon
 K46BX-D in Phillips County, Montana
 K47MF-D in Orderville, Utah
 K47MY-D in Red Lake, Minnesota
 K49BU-D in International Falls, Minnesota
 K51DF-D in Milton-Freewater, Oregon
 KAAP-LD in Santa Cruz, California
 KAGW-CD in Wichita, Kansas
 KBEH in Santa Paula, California
 KBID-LP in Fresno, California
 KBIT-LD in Monterey, California
 KBNT-CD in San Diego, California
 KCCX-LD in Corpus Christi, Texas
 KCWL-LD in Monroe, Louisiana
 KDSO-LD in Medford, Oregon
 KEGS-LD in Las Vegas, Nevada
 KEGW-CD in Siloam Springs, Arkansas
 KEOO-LD in Midland, Texas
 KFAM-CD in Lake Charles, Louisiana
 KFSM-TV in Van Buren, Arkansas
 KIAT-LD in Jonesboro, Arkansas
 KKFX-CD in San Luis Obispo, California
 KKTF-LD in Chico, California
 KMLN-LD in Fort Collins, Colorado
 KPMF-LD in Paragould, Arkansas
 KRLJ-LD in Joplin, Missouri
 KRPG-LD in Des Moines, Iowa
 KTTA-LD in Monroe, Utah
 KTUL in McAlester, Oklahoma
 KTXU-LD in West Lake Hills, Texas
 KXIP-LD in Paris, Texas
 KXTQ-CD in Lubbock, Texas
 KYCW-LD in Branson, Missouri
 KZLL-LD in Joplin, Missouri
 KZSA-LD in San Angelo, Texas
 W24CL-D in Grantsburg, Wisconsin
 W24CS-D in Reading, Pennsylvania
 W24DB-D in Clarks Summit, Pennsylvania
 W24DL-D in Saginaw, Michigan
 W24EC-D in Manteo, North Carolina
 W24ER-D in Clarksburg, West Virginia
 W24ES-D in Moorefield, West Virginia
 W24ET-D in Atlantic City, New Jersey
 W24EU-D in Erie, Pennsylvania
 W24EX-D in Florence, South Carolina
 W24EZ-D in Allingtown, Connecticut
 W24FB-D in Brazil, Indiana
 W24FC-D in Augusta, Georgia
 W39CA-D in Fulton, Mississippi
 WDCO-CD in Woodstock, Virginia
 WDDA-LD in Chattanooga, Tennessee
 WDEM-CD in Columbus, Ohio
 WDLH-LD in Evansville, Indiana
 WDMW-LD in Milwaukee, Wisconsin
 WFMZ-AB in Allentown, Pennsylvania
 WHSV-TV (DRT) in Winchester, Virginia
 WHTX-LD in Springfield, Massachusetts
 WJTS-CD in Jasper, Indiana
 WLWD-LD in Dayton, Ohio
 WMDO-CD in Washington, D.C., uses WDCO-CD's spectrum
 WNPX-LD in Nashville, Tennessee
 WONO-CD in Syracuse, etc., New York
 WPDN-LD in Pittsburgh, Pennsylvania
 WPHA-CD in Philadelphia, Pennsylvania
 WPXI (DRT) in Uniontown, Pennsylvania
 WQQZ-CD in Ponce, Puerto Rico
 WTBM-CD in Birmingham, Alabama
 WUBX-CD in Durham, etc., North Carolina
 WUDZ-LD in Indianapolis, Indiana
 WUWT-CD in Union City, Tennessee
 WVNC-LD in Watertown, New York
 WVND-LD in Suwanee, Georgia
 WWDD-LD in Havre De Grace, Maryland
 WWEO-LD in Defuniak Springs, Florida
 WYKE-CD in Inglis/Yankeetown, Florida
 WZCK-LD in Madison, Wisconsin

The following low-power stations, which are no longer licensed, formerly broadcast on analog or digital channel 24:
 K24CS-D in Granite Falls, Minnesota
 K24DA-D in Big Piney, etc., Wyoming
 K24DP in San Jon, New Mexico
 K24DX in Pendleton, etc., Oregon
 K24FA in Blythe, California
 K24FI in Orangeville, Utah
 K24GZ in Rock Springs, Wyoming
 K24IQ-D in Billings, Montana
 K24JI-D in Hermiston, Oregon
 K24JR-D in Orr, Minnesota
 K24KD-D in Salix, Iowa
 K24NL-D in Weed, California
 K24NN-D in Twin Falls, Idaho
 KIJK-LD in Lincoln, Nebraska
 KKAZ-CA in Omaha, Nebraska
 KPAH-LP in Laramie, Wyoming
 KQFW-LD in Dallas, Texas
 KRUB-LD in Cedar Rapids, Iowa
 KXLJ-LD in Juneau, Alaska
 W24BB-D in East Stroudsburg, Pennsylvania
 W24DE-D in Miami, Florida
 W24DM-D in Gainesville, Florida
 W24DN-D in Clarksburg, West Virginia
 W24OI in Virginia Beach, Virginia
 WAZH-CD in Harrisonburg, Virginia
 WEWE-LP in Sussex County, Delaware
 WLNN-CD in Boone, North Carolina
 WQTV-LP in Murray, Kentucky
 WSJX-LP in Aquadilla, Puerto Rico
 WUEB-LD in Rockford, Illinois

References

24 low-power